Beylik of Dilmaç (Dimleç or Demleç) was a small principality in East Anatolia (part of modern Turkey) founded in the 11th century .

After the battle of Malazgirt in 1071, the victorious Turkoman tribes led by ghazi warriors began to settle in Anatolia. One of these warriors was Dilmaç oğlu Mehmet (son of Dilmaç). After the Great Seljuk Empire conquered the city of Bitlis the city was given to Mehmet as an ikta i.e., nonheritable property in 1085.  After conquering nearby town of Erzen (now a hamlet), Mehmet died in 1104. During the reign of his son Togan Arslan, the beylik was no more a vassal of Great Seljuk Empire. In the early years of his reign, Togan Arslan accepted the suzerainty of Artukids and together with Artukids, participated in a number of military operations against Crusaders, the most important being Battle of Ager Sanguinis in 1119 where Roger of Salerno lost his life. After securing independence he also had to fight against other Turkic beyliks like Sökmenli and former suzerain Artukids to defend Bitlis from attacks. After Togan's death (1134 ?) his successors fought against Georgia and Danishmends. As the small principalities were replaced by greater powers the beylik had to accept the suzerainty of Ayyubids, Harzemshah Sultanate, Ilkhanids, and Timur. After the return of Timur, Akkoyunlu Turcomans captured all of their territory probably around the 1410s.

References

Sources 
 

Anatolian beyliks
History of Bitlis
Seljuk dynasty
States and territories established in 1085
States in medieval Anatolia
History of Bitlis Province